Imdadul Haq Milan (born 8 September 1955) is a Bangladeshi novelist and Journalist. He was editor of the daily newspaper Kaler Kantho. He is the recipient of Bangla Academy Literary Award in 1992 and Ekushey Padak in 2019.

Early life and education
Born in Bikrampur, Milan spent his childhood with his maternal grandmother. He then moved to Gendaria in Dhaka. He wrote his first story Bondhu in 1973.  Bangla Academy's Uttaradhikar magazine published his first novel Jabojjibon. Milan graduated from Jagannath College.

Works
As of February 2019, Milan has published over 200 books.

Romantic
 Bhalobashar Shukh Dukh (1993)

Non-fiction
Jabojjibon (Lifelong, written in 1976, published in 1990)
Nodi Upakhyan (The Story of River, 1985)
Bhumiputro (A Son of the Soil, 1985)
Kalakal (Proper or Improper Time, 985)
Poradhinota (Subjugation, 1985)
Rupnagor (A Place of Love, 1988)
Rajakartontro (Time of the Collaborators, 1990)

Based on liberation war
Kalo Ghora (The Black Horse)
Gherao
Ekattor O Ekjon Maa (2019)

Historical
Desh Vager Por (After the division of the country)
Neta Je Rate Nihoto Holen (The night the leader was assassinated)

Others
Noorjahan-1
Noorjahan-2
O Radha O Krisna (O Radha! O Krisna!) in 1977 (published in 1982)
Duhkho Kasto (Pains and Sufferings) in 1978 (published in 1982)
Uponayok (The Second Hero) in 1979 (published in 1990)
'' Kon Gramer meye(series BTV Natok)(2009–10)

References

External links

 
 ইমদাদুল হক মিলন কেন জনপ্রিয় কথাসাহিত্যিক

1955 births
Living people
People from Bikrampur
Bengali-language writers
Bangladeshi male novelists
Bangladeshi newspaper editors
Recipients of Bangla Academy Award
Recipients of the Ekushey Padak